Cordia lutea, known as yellow cordia or in Spanish ,
is a shrubby plant in the borage family (Boraginaceae), native to the Galápagos Islands, mainland Ecuador, Peru, and the Marquesas Islands in Polynesia. Common in the arid lowlands of the Galápagos, its relatively large yellow flowers make it easy to identify.

Description

The young branches are hairy. The upper side of the leaf is rough in texture but hairless; the lower side bears hairs.

The yellow flowers are arranged in cymes and are sweetly scented. Inside the flower there are five to eight stamens. The fruit has a fleshy pulp that is initially slimy when the fruit is opened, but becomes sticky on exposure.

Taxonomy
Cordia lutea was first described scientifically in 1791 by the French botanist Jean-Baptiste Lamarck, with its origin said to be Peru. The specific epithet lutea means "yellow", more usually a deep yellow. In 1852, the Swedish botanist Nils Johan Andersson collected in the Galápagos Islands, and in 1855 described Varronia flava, now considered to be the same species as Cordia lutea.

In regions such as the Galápagos, where several species of Cordia occur, C. lutea is said to be easy to identify, "due to its showy yellow flowers".

Phylogeny
A molecular phylogenetic study in 2005 suggested that Cordia lutea is most closely related to C. dentata, both from the New World, and that these two are the sister of a large clade of Old World species, together forming the Myxa clade within the genus. It is suggested that the origin of the clade was in the New World, from where it was dispersed to Africa and beyond by birds.

Distribution and habitat
Cordia lutea is native to Ecuador, both the western part of the mainland and the Galápagos Islands, Peru, and the Marquesas Islands in Polynesia. It grows in arid regions. In the Galápagos, it is found in the lowlands, often close to the sea.

References

Bibliography

lutea
Plants described in 1791
Flora of the Galápagos Islands
Flora of Ecuador
Flora of Peru
Flora of the Marquesas Islands